Ron Korb is a Grammy-nominated Canadian flutist (flautist) and composer.

Musical style

Korb is best known for writing culturally diverse music and his mastery of a wide array of world music wind instruments. His work spans a range of genres including Classical, Jazz, Latin, Asian, Celtic music, and Middle Eastern. Many of his songs are program music based on stories themes that form concept albums. The concepts often come from his exploration of his multi-cultural ancestry and extensive travel experience.

Education

Ron Korb started on the recorder in grade school and later joined an Irish fife and drum band in his teens. While attending the Royal Conservatory of Music, he won several local music competitions. He attended York University for a year to broaden his experience of playing jazz but later earned a scholarship to study classical flute at University of Toronto where he graduated with a degree in Music Performance. His primary teacher was Douglas Stewart but he also participated in master classes with Paula Robison, Robert Aitken in Shawnigan, Raymond Guiot in Domaine Forget and Michel Debost in Assisi, Italy. After graduating with honors from University, Korb discovered Chinese flutes (Chinese: 笛子, English:Dizi, [pinyin]: dÍ zÎ). The sound of the Asian bamboo flute intrigued him so much that he moved to Japan in the early '90s to study Japanese Gagaku court music, the traditional shinobue and ryūteki bamboo flutes with Akao Michiko. Since then he has travelled around the world collecting and studying indigenous flutes. He has a collection of more than 250 flutes.

Career

Ron Korb has released more than 30 solo albums on various record labels.

Ron has had many collaborations with longtime friend Donald Quan. In 1990 they released Tear of the Sun which charted No. 1 in the Canadian New Age Music Top 40 and in 2001 they did the musical direction for Peter Gabriel's Tribute and Homage for Harbourfront Centre's "World Leaders". The musical talent they shared the stage with included Peter Gabriel, Jane Siberry, Tia Carrere, Arn Chorn-Pond, Jeff Martin, Andy Stochansky and Lorraine Segato. That same year they penned the song for the Toronto Olympic Bid which was performed by the Toronto Symphony, Samba Squad and Nathaniel Dett Chorale in Roy Thomson Hall.

In 2004 Ron Korb Live was released which was filmed in Victoriaville Quebec, directed by Pierre and François Lamoureux and became the first independent artist in Canada to release a full-length DVD.

Composing

Other than writing the instrumental pieces for his albums he has also written songs for major Asian singers. His song for Alan Tam achieved Double Platinum sales. Another song recorded by the "Godfather of Cantopop" Roman Tam won Best Original Composition at the RTHK awards (Radio Television Hong Kong), Hong Kong's equivalent of the Grammys. In 2008 Ron was asked to put together a book of flute and piano pieces for classical flute exams for the Australian Music Examinations Board Flute for Leisure syllabus. Ron has also composed music for film dance and theatre. In 2012, Ron Korb's classical crossover album Europa (officially released in 2013, won the Global Music Awards, California, in 4 categories including: Award of Excellence-Album, Composition (St. Johann), Album Art/Graphics (Designer: Jade Yeh); Award of Merit: Acoustic Instrumental Solo Performance (St. Johann). His composition, Beckett's Whisper, originally written for Irish flute, pennywhistle, violin, cello, Celtic harp, accordion, double bass and piano, was rearranged by Korb himself for the Canadian Flute Association for flute choir: Piccolo, 4 C Flutes (flute 4 requires low B foot), Alto flute, Bass flute, Contrabass flute. Beckett's Whisper for flute choir was included in the 1st Canadian Flute Convention Closing Program as well as the opening concert of the 2014 National Flute Association (NFA) Convention in Chicago (played by Windy City Flute Orchestra, conducted by Kelly Via)

Discography
2018 World Café
2015 Asia Beauty
2013 Europa
2010 Oriental Angels vs Ron Korb DVD, China
2009 Once Upon A Time (龍笛傳說), Taiwan
2009 Dragon Heart(龍の心), Singapore
2008 Native Earth (聖靈大地), Taiwan
2007 Ron Korb 龙笛-当代第一魔笛, China
2006 Our Native Land
2006 East West Road, Singapore
2005 Rainforest Flute-Ron Korb and Ken Davis, Australia
2005 Seasons: Christmas Carols – with Donald Quan
2005 Ron Korb Live (Singapore)
2004 Ron Korb Live DVD
2004 Ron Korb Live CD
2004 Celtic Quest (重返祕世界), Taiwan
2003 Romancing The Dragon-The Best of Ron Korb, Singapore
2003 World Of Ron Korb
2002 Taming The Dragon 龍笛, Taiwan
2001 Behind the Mask東方戀, Taiwan
2001 Celtic Heartland 心靈祕境, Taiwan
2000 Celtic Heartland 
2000 Celtic Quest
2000 Rencontre en Provence, France
1999 Tapestries-Titanic Odyssey
1999 Mada Minu Tomo e, Japan
1999 Taming The Dragon 
1998 Celtic Skye
1998 Natural Friends (UK)
1996 Tapestries-Celtic Dawn
1995 Behind The Mask
1994 Flute Traveller
1993 Japanese Mysteries –with Hiroki Sakaguchi
1990 Tear of the Sun – with Donald Quan

Single 
2021 Plenty Nan (Le Studio Version) 
2019 Sister of the Wind 
2016 Behind the Mask

Awards and recognitions

Independent Music Award for Best Album – World Beat (World Café), 2018
Nominee for 58th Grammy Award for Best New Age Album (Asia Beauty), 2016
First Prize, Best Instrumental (Two Mountains from Asia Beauty), IAMA 2016
Gold Medal Winner – Best of Show, Best Instrumental Album (Asia Beauty), The Global Music Awards 2015 
Best World Album(Asia Beauty), Zone Music Award 2015 
First Prize, Best World/Global Fusion Album (Asia Beauty), One World Music Awards 2015
Best Instrumental Performance (Blue Bamboo from Album Asia Beauty), The Global Music Awards 2015
Silver Medal Winners – Outstanding Achievement, Chinese Crossover World Music (House of the Five Beauties from Album Asia Beauty) and Album Art/Graphics (Asia Beauty), The Global Music Awards 2015
Finalist in the open song category (Hanoi Café from Album Asia Beauty), International Acoustic Music Awards 2015
Nominee on Best World Music, Toronto Independent Music Awards 2015
Grand Prize Winner, Canadian National Exhibition
2012 Beckett's Whisper (from Album Europa), Finalist, International Acoustic Music Awards

References

External links 
 Ron Korb official website
 

Canadian film score composers
Male film score composers
Canadian flautists
Musicians from Toronto
University of Toronto alumni
The Royal Conservatory of Music alumni
Canadian classical flautists
Canadian jazz flautists
Canadian experimental musicians
Canadian record producers
Canadian musicians of Japanese descent
Canadian world music musicians
New-age musicians
Living people
Canadian male jazz musicians
Year of birth missing (living people)